Machairas can refer to:

 Leontios Machairas, a 15th-century Cypriot Greek historian
 Machairas Monastery, a 12th-century monastery in Cyprus
 Machairas, Aetolia-Acarnania, a village in the municipal unit Astakos, western Greece